Genaro Hernández (May 10, 1966 – June 7, 2011) was an American professional boxer who competed from 1984 to 1998. He was a two-time super featherweight world champion, having held the WBA title from 1991 to 1995, and the WBC and lineal titles from 1997 to 1998. Additionally, he challenged for the WBO lightweight title in 1995.

Professional career
Hernández, a Mexican-American, enjoyed a distinguished career as a professional boxer. His debut as a paid fighter came on September 27, 1984, when he beat Dino Ramirez by a decision in four rounds at Inglewood. He racked up a record of 13–0 with 6 knockouts and a solid reputation as a future champion around Southern California, when he met former Julio César Chávez world title challenger Refugio Rojas on November 22, 1988. He beat Rojas, who had lasted seven rounds against Chávez, by a knockout in round six. This enabled Hernández to enter the WBA super featherweight rankings. Hernandez went on to win seven more fights, four by knockout, including one over former world title challenger Felipe Orozco, and another, in his first professional fight abroad: a three-round knockout over Leon Collins in Tokyo, Japan.

WBA super featherweight champion
Exactly two years after his win over Rojas, Hernández got his first world title try, against Daniel Londas, on November 22, 1991, at Épernay, France. Hernández did not disappoint those who had predicted him to be a future world champion as he knocked out future world champion Londas in nine rounds in front of Londas' hometown crowd, becoming World Junior Lightweight champion by winning the until then vacant title. In 1992, he defended his crown twice, knocking out Omar Catari in six rounds and, travelling to Japan once more, defeating challengers Masuaki Takeda and Yuji Watanabe, Takeda by decision and Watanabe by knockout in six.

His next fight proved historic, albeit for the wrong reasons. Defending on April 26, 1993, once again at Inglewood against former world featherweight champion Raúl Pérez, Hernández had to settle for a first round technical draw. This was the first, and so far only, world title fight in which no punches were landed. Right after the initial bell, Perez headbutted Hernández, and Perez bled profusely from an arterial vein on his forehead. The referee summoned the ring doctor, who decided the fight should be stopped as Perez required immediate surgery. In the June 28 rematch later that year, Hernández retained the world title by a knockout in round eight. Hernandez then closed the year by defeating Harold Warren by decision to once again keep his title. In 1994, Hernandez retained the title twice, including a victory over Jimmy Garcia, (who would die later after a fight with Gabriel Ruelas). By the end of 1994, Hernández was clamoring for a world title fight against crosstown rival and WBO lightweight champion Oscar De La Hoya.

After eight successful title defenses, Hernández vacated his WBA super featherweight title in order to face De La Hoya in the upcoming year. Hernández began 1995 by beating another Mexican boxing legend, Jorge Maromero Páez, by a knockout in eight rounds at Inglewood. The Hernández-Páez fight was overshadowed by another news  that rattled the Latino world that day: The death of famed Tejano singer Selena Quintanilla.

WBO lightweight title challenge
On September 9, the highly anticipated encounter between Hernández and de la Hoya took place in Las Vegas. Hernández lost for the first time in his career, retiring from the fight at the end of the sixth round, his nose bloody: He returned to his corner, but without sitting down motioned to his team that he did not want to continue the fight. Reportedly, he had come to the fight with a nose previously injured in a sparring session. Up until the fight's end, the judges had de la Hoya holding a lead on all three scorecards. After the loss Hernández took some brief time off but by 1996 he was back inside the ring, winning two bouts that year.

WBC and lineal super featherweight champion
In 1997, he fought what almost turned into another controversial fight when he challenged Azumah Nelson in a title bout for the WBC & Lineal super featherweight titles, in Corpus Christi, Texas. Ahead on all scorecards at the end of round seven, he was hit in his throat by a Nelson punch after the bell. He needed some time to recuperate from the illegal late hit, and WBC President José Sulaiman came to his corner and informed him that if he could not continue he would be declared winner by disqualification. Hernández told Sulaiman something along the lines of I want to win it like real champions do, and he went back to the fight at the beginning of round eight. The fight ended after twelve rounds and Hernández won the Super featherweight titles by defeating Nelson with a split decision victory.

Hernández went on to defend his crown against such capable challengers as future super featherweight champion Anatoly Alexandrov, Carlos Gerena and another future world champion Carlos Famoso Hernandez, a gym-mate and personal friend who would later become El Salvador's first world boxing champion in history.

In what would turn out to be his last fight, on October 3 of 1998 he lost his titles to Floyd Mayweather Jr. by an 8th round retirement.

Retirement
In December 1998, after he was diagnosed with a blood clot and a torn cartilage muscle, he announced his retirement with a record of 38 wins, 2 losses and 1 draw, with 17 of those wins coming by knockout. He had intended to challenge WBC lightweight champion César Bazán before the diagnosis.

Life after boxing

Hernández worked as a boxing instructor at the LA Boxing Gym in Lake Forest, California until early 2011. He helped out in a broadcast of a boxing match in Maywood after that.

Illness and death
After retiring from boxing Hernández was diagnosed with stage four rhabdomyosarcoma of the head and neck, a very rare form of cancer, and one which Hernández' insurance would not cover for treatment. Although Hernández collected several large purses in his career, including $600,000 for his final fight against Mayweather, he was not able to afford his expensive treatments and benefits were held to assist in paying what insurance would not cover. Bob Arum, of Top Rank Promotions, who promoted Hernández, footed Hernandez' bills for chemotherapy for a number of years, until Hernandez died, also having him brought to and from the chemotherapy sessions. In mid 2009 it was reported that Hernández' cancer was in remission but in early 2010 the cancer had returned and Hernández was undergoing treatment.

On June 3, 2011, it was announced that Hernández would stop chemotherapy treatment. Hernández died from cancer on June 7, 2011, at the age of 45. Floyd Mayweather paid for Hernández's funeral expenses.

Championships and accomplishments
 Cauliflower Alley Club
 Boxing Honoree (1993)
 World Boxing Association
 WBA Super Featherweight Championship (one Time)
 World Boxing Council
 WBC Super Featherweight Championship (one time)
 Other Championships
 California Super Featherweight Championship (one time)

Professional boxing record

Pay-per-view bouts

See also
List of super featherweight boxing champions
List of WBC world champions
List of WBA world champions
List of Mexican boxing world champions

References

External links

Genaro Hernández profile at Cyber Boxing Zone

1966 births
2011 deaths
American boxers of Mexican descent
Deaths from cancer in California
Boxers from Los Angeles
World super-featherweight boxing champions
World Boxing Council champions
World Boxing Association champions
American male boxers
Super-featherweight boxers
Lightweight boxers